Stigmata is a Sri Lankan heavy metal band based in Colombo, formed in 1998.

Biography

Early years 
Suresh De Silva, Andrew Obeysekara and Tennyson Napoleon formed the band in 1998 at S. Thomas' College, Mt Lavinia, where they were schoolmates. They chose the name "Stigmata" from the 1998 album Stigmata by melodic death metal band Arch Enemy. The band's style is a unique style called "Pure Sri Lankan Metal" a mix of Sri Lankan origin fused rhythms and Eastern arrangements mixed cohesively into a framework of progressive metal and rock, thrash metal, speed metal, power metal along with tech death, death metal and hard rock influence, laced with a global sound incorporating multiple genres like jazz, Latin rhythms, classical, fusion, middle-eastern and Baila. They played their first ever concert at S.Thomas' College, Mount Lavinia in February 2000.

With bass player Shehan Gray and drummer Anik Jayasekara, they released their first single, "Fear", which topped the local radio rock-chart show. In 2000 they recorded another, "Voices", which was a sensation in the stagnant local music industry, and was a chart-topping hit. In 2001 the band took on drummer Dilukshan Jayawardena, following the departure of Jayasekara due to personal reasons. The band released their first EP, Morbid Indiscretion, in 2002, containing the singles "The Dying Winter Sleeps" and "Thicker Than Blood" plus the instrumental "Andura" which inspired the Gajaga Wannama. At the time, the band also covered music by international bands such as Deep Purple, Metallica, and Led Zeppelin, as well as bands not so popular in the country at that time, such as Iron Maiden, Iced Earth, Judas Priest, and Cradle of Filth, which made them revolutionary by exposing Sri Lankans to music many in the country had never heard before.

Hollow Dreams and Silent Chaos Serpentine 
In 2003, drummer Nishantha Fernando joined the band, following the departure of Dilukshan for higher education. The success of the original singles released up to this point culminated in the band launching their first album, Hollow Dreams, in August 2003 on the local "Rock Company" label. The band continued to influence many youth in the country to form their own heavy metal bands and carve a unique Sri Lankan heavy metal sound.

In 2004, Vije Dhas became Stigmata's bass player, after Shehan Gray left for Australia. Former drummer Dilukshan temporarily stepped in after Nishantha Fernando left the band earlier that year. In 2005 the band found permanent drummer Osanda Wangeesa, and the range of the band was further increased, with the addition of double-bass drumming. In late 2004 the band also recorded the successful acoustic track titled "Lucid" which made innovative use of the Indian tabla, played by Sri Lankan percussionist Jananath Warakagoda. This was a prelude to the heavier, electric version of this song released on the bands' second studio album, Silent Chaos Serpentine, in February 2006. Silent Chaos Serpentine was an evolutionary step showcasing the band’s ability to compose intricate pieces that were memorable and also palpable to a global audience with a unique sound and style

SCS placed the ensemble toe to toe with the global metal community, receiving rave reviews around the world in the US, UK, Australia, Germany, Japan, Middle East and many other countries. Silent Chaos Serpentine was selected as one of the Top 10 Must Have Albums in 2006/2007 by leading webzines around the world.

The release of SCS  was followed up by concerts in the Maldive Islands (The Rock Storm Festival) in June 2006 making them the first Sri Lankan based Metal/Rock band to tour internationally. Drummer Ranil 'Jacky' Senarath joined the band in August 2005, and played on SCS. Vije Dhas left the band in 2008 and was replaced by Javeen Soyza. In October 2008, the band was listed on Ultimate Guitar's Unsigned Artists of the Month, with a rating of 7.[5]

Stigmata performed at the MTV India sponsored SAARC Band Festival in Delhi to 25,000 attendees, garnering a larger audience supporting them.   

In 2009, Stigmata released "A Dead Rose Wails for Light" which was also available on the band's Myspace site. The band was interviewed and asked to perform "A Dead Rose Wails for Light" for Ian Wright's Out of Bounds, a travel series on the Discovery Channel. The band headlined for the SUE (Southern Ultimate Explosion) 2009 metal music festival in Johor, Malaysia.

Drummer Ranil 'Jacky' Senarath joined the band in August 2005, after the departure of Osanda. Vije Dhas left the band in 2008 and was replaced by Javeen Soyza. In October 2008, the band was listed on Ultimate Guitar's Unsigned Artists of the Month, with a rating of 7.

In 2009, Stigmata released "A Dead Rose Wails for Ligh t" which was also available on the band's Myspace site. The band was interviewed and asked to perform "A Dead Rose Wails for Light" for Ian Wright's Out of Bounds, a travel series on the Discovery Channel. The band headlined for the SUE (Southern Ultimate Explosion) 2009 metal music festival in Johor, Malaysia.

Psalms of Conscious Martyrdom (2010) 

The band's third album, Psalms of Conscious Martyrdom, was released on 26 June 2010. The album was gorund breaking and genre busting becoming popular enough to help Stigmata get a tour of Australia as part of the prestigious Melbourne International Arts Festival under the artistic direction of Brett Sheehy in October 2010 and performing at the historic Forum Theatre Melbourne alongside Dead Meadow (USA), Blarke Bayer / Black Widow (Australia), making them the first-ever Sri Lankan heavy metal band to tour there.

Psalms of Conscious Martyrdom was hailed as a more complex body of work fusing psyche metal with a more robust and adventurous progressive element resulting in the album becoming a global underground sensation, receiving rave reviews wowrldwide in US, Australia, UK, Germany, Scandinavia, Asia and the Middle East. Psalms of Conscious Martyrdom featured Suresh, Tenny, Andrew, Javeen and Taraka Roshan Seneviratne on drums, and the album was also picked as a Year End Favourite by webzines and prog rock zines worldwide.The Band toured Malaysia performing at the Ultimate Southern Rock Explosion.

Stigmata was featured for a second time on The Discovery Channel during the year Psalms of Conscious Martyrdom was released. VICE Magazine Australia and a journalist from Japan covered the launch event and the day leading up to it.  

Javeen and Taraka departed to concentrate on their other band Tantrum and were replaced by Lakmal Wijeyagunawardene on Bass and Chathuranga Pitigala on Drums. The band was the first to perform at an army stadium at Dhaka, Bangladesh to over 30,000 people. They toured India, performed at “Resurrection Dubai’ in Dubai in that time.

The Ascetic Paradox (2015) 
On October 17, 2015, the band released their fourth album, The Ascetic Paradox.

The Ascetic Paradox featured Tenny, Andrew, Suresh, Roshan Taraka on drums and Lakmal Wijegunawardene on Bass. TAP as it’s called consisted of music that was more intricate by design and a departure towards heavier leanings with the bulk of the album written by Tennyson Napoleon and Suresh de Silva, as internal struggles developed within the band regarding the band’s musical evolution and personal problems that had cultivated for some time between the members. Certain members felt the need for the band to move towards a more commercial sphere, some pushing towards the ensemble to start playing weddings and conventional shows for money, while others fought to maintain the identity and integrity of the band.

Nearly Disbanded - The Ultimate Struggle 
Stigmata toured New Zealand in support of the release of the new album, was played out by the organizers and some of the local sponsors and found themselves nearly stranded in New Zealand after the tour. The band returned and greater turmoil resulted in the gigantic debt incurred due to the issues that arose from the tour and coupling that with the already disintegrating internal struggles Andrew, Taraka and Lakmal left the band under little given notice. Left traumatized and with little hope Suresh and Tennyson forged onwards, Suresh worked strenuously for over 2 years and settled all the debts and loans incurred by the band, while Tennyson kept the spirit of the band going by auditioning members and writing new music. It was time to wipe the slate clean.

A New Era (2018-2021) 
In 2018 Stigmata renewed and refocused were joined by Thisara Dhananjaya on bass (he plays keyboards, guitar, is a talented vocalist and is a producer), Shafeek Shuail on Rhythm Guitars and Udaya Wickremage on drums. The band played at the Sri Lankan Comic Con and a string of other shows. Udaya was replaced by Hafzel Preena.

Stigmata entered the digital Asia Video Music Awards and emerged the winners with their single ‘An Idle Mind is the Devil’s Workshop’ and the amazing video by Randy Chris bagging gold.  

Shafer departed a short while after to pursue personal responsibilities.  

At this point Suresh and Tenny decided to go forth as a 4 piece, working on innovating a new sound and marking a new era of the band. The quartet now consisting of Suresh, Tenny, Thisara and Hafzel released a new anthem “Heavy is the Head that Wears the Crown” to much acclaim, with Kasun Nawaratne producing the single. The video was released in dual formats; one featuring local Cosplayers and the other featuring only the band. The song was a tribute penned inspired by Marvel’s Avengers: Infinity War and Stigmata was the first Lankan band to have one of their videos aired at a movie premier prior to the film played at the cinema.

Alyssa, Sacred Spaces, Throw Glass & a Grammy Nominated Producer 

Stigmata played a series of local shows before the Covid-19 pandemic crippled the world. While all live events were cancelled indefinitely for over 2 years, Stigmata continued with their stringent work ethic, rehearsed and recorded new hit singles; the emoptional “Alyssa” in 2019,  “Sacred Spaces: Solve et Coagula” in 2020 and “Throw Glass in a House of Stone” in 2021, mixed and mastered by Grammy nominated producer Romesh Dodangoda.

“Alyssa” is a fan favourite as the band penned it in memory of all the lost and departed pets and rescues in peoples’ lives. The music video featured photos and videos sent from around the world of dogs, cats, birds and all manner of pets that owners have lost through the years making it one of the most emotonal and emotive musical creations to touch many a life.

The band tied up with US Record Label Serendip Music Group and Serandip Records in 2020-2021 before cutting all ties after enormous artist scandals emerged in public with the label having exploited and played out artists on their roster.

2022 and the 5th Album 
Stigmata broke the post pandemic hiatus in 2022 tying up with Guinness and a host of other partners and organized and played two sold out shows “Unchained Melody” in March and “Arise” in June in Sri Lanka. The band was joined by iconic skinsman Harshan Gallage on drums in 2022.

Stigmata are working on new music, have planned a series of concerts around Sri Lanka, are prepping to hit the studio in 2022 to start working on their 5th Album. The quintet hopes to tour and prove once more that they are an unstoppable force to be reckoned with and one of the most sought after live bands in thew region.

Style and lyrical themes 
The lyrical themes of the band are generally from poetry by the bands' vocalist lyricist, Suresh and cover topics such as apathy, child abuse, politics, war, social degradation, emotional paralysis, transgressions and inner struggle. However the band's third album saw Stigmata dealing with fresh themes like psychic voyages, spiritual and para-psychological endeavors, suicide, etc. Today the band’s hemes have evolved to subject matter tackling human consciousness, our shadow selves, human condition and psyche, personal loss, life and death and fractured spirituality.

Discography

Studio releases 
 2003: Hollow Dreams
 2006: Silent Chaos Serpentine
 2010: Psalms of Conscious Martyrdom
 2015: The Ascetic Paradox

EPs 
 2002: Morbid Indiscretion

Various artists compilations 
 2003: Rock Company Compilation I
 2005: Rock Company Compilation II
 2008: Sri Lankan Heavy Metal Compilation Volume 1

Singles 

 "Fear" – (1999)
 "Redemption" – (1999)
 "Voices" – (2000)
 "Thicker than Blood" – (2003)
 "The Dying Winter Sleeps" – (2003)
 "Extinction" – (2003)
 “Hollow Dreams” - (2003) 
 “Inspired” - (2003) 
 Falling Away - (2003) 
 "Lucid" (Acoustic) – (2004)
 “Forgiven, Forgotten” - (2006)
 “Jazz Theory” - (2006)
 “Lucid” (Heavy) - (2006)  
 "Solitude" – (2006)
 "My Malice" – (2007)
 "A Dead Rose Wails for Light" – (2008/9)
 "Purer (Libera Nos a Malo)" – (2010)
 “Spiral Coma” - (2010)
 “An Idle Mind is the Devil’s Workshop” - (2015)
 “Axioma” - (2015) 
 “Heavy is the Head that Wears the Crown” - (2018)
 “Alyssa” - (2019) 
 “Sacred Spaces: Solve et Coaglua” - (2020) 
 “Throw Glass in a House of Stone” - (2021)

Music videos 
"Falling Away"
"On the Wings of the Storm"
"An Idle Mind Is The Devil's Workshop"

Band members 

Current members
 Suresh De Silva – Vocals, Lyrics (1999–present)
 Tennyson Napoleon – Rhythm Guitar (1999–2017), Lead Guitar (2017–present)
 Thisara Dhananjaya – Bass Guitar (2017–present)
 Shayne Seneviratne (2022-present)
 Shavin Hettiarachchi (2022-present) 
Past Members
 Shafeek Shuhail - Rhythm Guitar (2017–2019)
 Andrew Obeyesekere – Lead Guitar (1999–2017)
 Javeen Soysa – bass guitar (2008–2010)
 Yohan Gunawardena – drums (1999)
 Shehan Gray – bass guitar (2000–2003)
 Anik Jayasekara – drums (2000)
 Dilukshan Jayawardena – drums (2001–2003), (2004)
 Nishantha Fernando – drums (2003–2004)
 Osanda Wangeesa – drums (2004–2004)
 Vije Dhas – bass guitar (2004–2008)
 Ranil "Jackson" Senarath – drums (2005–2009)
 RoshanTaraka Seniviratne - drums (2010-2012, 2015-2016)
 Lakmal Wijeyagunewardena (2014-2016)  
 Chathuranga Pitigala – drums (2012–2015)
 Nirodha Jayasinghe – drums (2011–2011)
 Udaya Wickramage - drums (2017-2018) 
 Shafeek Shuail - rhythm guitars (2017-2019) 
 Hafzel Preena - Drums (2018–2022)
 Harshan Gallage - Drums (2022)

References

External links 
Official website

Sri Lankan heavy metal musical groups
Musical groups established in 1999
1999 establishments in Sri Lanka